Féthi Harek (born 21 October 1982) is a former professional footballer who played as a defender. Having begun his career with lower league sides AS Saint-Priest, FAIRM Île-Rousse Monticello, and Rodez AF, he spent the majority of his career with SC Bastia and Nîmes Olympique. Born in France, at international level he was capped once for the Algeria national team.

Club career

Harek was born in Oullins, France, to a family originally from Tlemcen, Algeria.

He started his playing career as a striker for various amateur sides such as AS Saint-Priest, FAIRM Île-Rousse Monticello and Rodez AF. In the 2006–07 season, he helped Rodez win promotion to the third-tier Championnat National. His performances did not go unnoticed, and he was signed at the end of that season by Bastia.

In July 2014, after seven years in Bastia playing in Ligue 1, Ligue 2 and National, Harek signed a three-year contract with Nîmes Olympique.

International career
Harek received his first call-up to the Algeria national football team for a friendly against DR Congo on 26 March 2008 in Paris, France. He made his debut at halftime, replacing Salim Arrache on the left wing.

Career statistics

Club

Honours
Bastia
 Championnat National: 2010–11
 Ligue 2: 2011–12
 Ligue 2 Team of the Year: 2011–12

References

External links
 
 
 

Living people
1982 births
People from Oullins
French sportspeople of Algerian descent
Association football defenders
Algeria international footballers
Algerian footballers
AS Saint-Priest players
Rodez AF players
SC Bastia players
Nîmes Olympique players
Ligue 1 players
Ligue 2 players
Championnat National players
Sportspeople from Lyon Metropolis
French footballers
Footballers from Auvergne-Rhône-Alpes